Achva was a Jewish neighborhood which located eastern-northern to Jaffa, established in 1899, by traditional Ashkenazi Jews. its location was in the southern area of today's Achva Street in Tel Aviv, near Suzanne Dellal Center for Dance and Theater. by the 1920s, the neighborhood has been merged with Tel Aviv Municipality.

References 

Ashkenazi Jewish culture in Tel Aviv
Neighborhoods of Tel Aviv
History of Tel Aviv
1890s establishments in Ottoman Syria